Lowell Township is a township in Cherokee County, Kansas, USA.  As of the 2010 census, its population was 675.

Geography
According to the USGS, it contains three cemeteries: Boston Mills, Hillcrest and Stevenson.

The streams of Shawnee Creek, Short Creek and Spring Branch run through this township.

References
 USGS Geographic Names Information System (GNIS)

External links
 City-Data.com

Townships in Cherokee County, Kansas
Townships in Kansas